Paul Bailey may refer to:
Paul Bailey (British writer) (born 1937), British writer and critic
Paul Dayton Bailey (1906–1987), American writer 
Paul Bailey (politician) (born 1968), member of the Tennessee Senate
Paul J. Bailey (1922–2001), American Thoroughbred racing jockey